Ronov nad Doubravou is a town in Chrudim District in the Pardubice Region of the Czech Republic. It has about 1,700 inhabitants.

Administrative parts
Villages of Mladotice and Moravany are administrative parts of Ronov nad Doubravou.

Notable people
Antonín Chittussi (1847–1891), painter

Gallery

References

External links

Cities and towns in the Czech Republic
Populated places in Chrudim District